The Tirona Highway is a two-to-four lane, primary highway in Cavite, Philippines. The road was named for Filipino revolutionary leader Daniel Tirona.

The road forms part of National Route 62 (N62) of the Philippine highway network.

References

External links 
 Department of Public Works and Highways

Roads in Cavite